Bang!... The Greatest Hits of Frankie Goes to Hollywood is a compilation album by Frankie Goes to Hollywood, released in 1993 during a spate of reissuing and remixing of Frankie Goes to Hollywood products by ZTT Records, hence the appearance of "classic" 1993 versions of two tracks, and the addition of one contemporary remix on the American CD version of 1994.

Track listing

CD: Warner / 4509-93912-2 United Kingdom 
 "Relax" – 3:55 from Welcome to the Pleasuredome, classic 1993 version
 "Two Tribes" – 3:56 from Welcome to the Pleasuredome, single version
 "War (Hide Yourself!)" – 4:14 original B-side version
 "Ferry Cross the Mersey" – 4:03 original B-side version
 "Warriors of the Wasteland" – 3:55 from Liverpool, single remix
 "For Heaven's Sake" – 4:27 from Liverpool
 "The World Is My Oyster" – 1:57 from Welcome to the Pleasuredome
 "Welcome to the Pleasuredome" – 13:39 from Welcome to the Pleasuredome
 "Watching the Wildlife" – 3:58 from Liverpool, classic 1993 version
 "Born to Run" – 4:05 from Welcome to the Pleasuredome
 "Rage Hard" – 5:04 from Liverpool, single version
 "The Power of Love" – 5:28 from Welcome to the Pleasuredome
 "Bang" – 1:08 from Welcome to the Pleasuredome

CD: Atlantic / 82587-2 United States 
 "Relax" – 3:55
 "Two Tribes" – 3:54
 "War" – 4:14
 "Ferry Cross the Mersey" – 4:03
 "Warriors of the Wasteland" – 3:55
 "For Heaven's Sake" – 4:27
 "The World Is My Oyster" – 1:57
 "Welcome to the Pleasuredome" – 13:39
 "Watching the Wildlife" – 3:58
 "Born to Run" – 4:05
 "Rage Hard" – 5:04
 "The Power of Love" – 5:28
 "Bang" – 1:08
 "Relax" (New York Mix) – 7:27
 "Two Tribes" (Teckno Prisoner Mix featuring Adamski) – 6:21

Charts

Weekly charts

Year-end charts

Certifications

References

External links 
 Bang!... The Greatest Hits of Frankie Goes to Hollywood at Discogs

1993 greatest hits albums
Albums produced by Trevor Horn
Frankie Goes to Hollywood albums